Abd-Allah Hatefi, commonly known as Hatefi (also spelled Hatifi; ; 1454 – 1521) was a Persian poet and nephew of the distinguished poet Jami (died 1492).

Life
Hatefi was born in 1454 at Khargerd, a village which formed a district of the town Jam, which was in turn a dependency of the Khorasanian city of Herat. Jami's mother was a sister of the distinguished poet Jami (died 1492), but unlike his Sunni uncle, Hatefi was a Shi'ite. Jami most of his whole life in his hometown, where he served as the custodian of the mausoleum of the Timurid-era poet Qasem-e Anvar. Hatefi became part of the literary elite after prevailing in a test that was set up by Jami. In the late 15th-century, Hatefi travelled alongside fellow poet Amir Homayun Esfaraini to Azerbaijan and Arabian Iraq. Between 1485 and 1490, Hatefi stayed at the court of  the Aq Qoyunlu ruler Ya'qub Beg in Tabriz in northwestern Iran. 

Due to being a Shi'ite, Hatefi was respected by the Safavid shah (king) Ismail I, who had conquered Khorasan in 1510. However, Hatefi later acted as a mediator for the Sunni population of Jam, who were seen in a negative light by Ismail I. Ismail, who sought to associate himself with Persian literature, requested Hatefi to write a historical epic similar to that of his previous Zafarnama (also known as the Timur-nama), a biography of the Turco-Mongol ruler Timur.

Hatefi died in 1521 in Khargerd, and was buried in his former garden.

Works
Hatefi composed poetry in several genre but he is known above all for his Khamsa (pentalogue).  Modelled after previous petanologues of Persian literature including those of Nizami Ganjavi, his Khamsa became famous even outside of Iran. Lami'i Chelebi, produced an Ottoman translation of his work, and the several editions of his Khamsa in the Ottoman Empire and in India are proof of his widespread fame.  Hatefi's literary fame rests on his realistic and straightforward style. He displayed a remarkable originality in handling his stories with his style often emulated by later poets. Four of his works in his Khamsa have been published thus far.

The five works which are comprised by his Khamsa are:

Layli o Majnun
Shirin o Khosrow
Haft manzar
Zafarnama
Fotuhat-e shahi

See also

List of Persian poets and authors
Persian literature

References

Sources 
 
 
 
 

1450s births
1521 deaths
15th-century Iranian writers
16th-century Iranian writers
15th-century Persian-language poets
16th-century Persian-language poets
Poets from the Timurid Empire
Poets of the Aq Qoyunlu